86th Kvartal is a rural locality (a settlement) in Zorkaltsevskoye Rural Settlement of Tomsky District, Russia. The population was 136 as of 2015.

Streets 
 Zelyonaya
 Lesnaya
 Shkolnaya
 Tsentralnaya
 Traktovaya
 Rabochaya
 Mira
 Zelyonyy Pereulok
 Sosnovaya

Geography 
86th Kvartal is located 38 km southwest of Tomsk (the district's administrative centre) by road. Yubileyny is the nearest rural locality.

References 

Rural localities in Tomsk Oblast